Reiner Klimke (14 January 1936 – 17 August 1999) was a German equestrian, who won six gold and two bronze medals in dressage at the Summer Olympics — a record for equestrian events that has since been surpassed. He appeared in six Olympics from 1960 to 1988, excluding the 1980 Games that were boycotted by West Germany.

Equestrian career
Klimke studied Harry Boldt and Gustaf Rau.

He won team gold in 1964, 1968 (both on Dux), 1976 (riding Mehmed), 1984 and 1988 (both with Ahlerich), and the individual gold in 1984 on Ahlerich.

His two bronze medals came in the individual event in 1968 and 1976. Klimke also had a fine record at the World Championships, winning six gold medals: two individual, in 1974 on Mehmed and in 1982 on Ahlerich, and four team: 1966, 1974, 1982, 1986.

At the European Championships, he was the individual champion in 1967, 1973, and 1985 and rode on seven winning West German teams (1965, 1973, 1983, 1985, and others) . Klimke also competed in eventing early in his career. He was a member of the winning West German three-day event team at the 1959 European Championships, and finished 18th in individual eventing at the 1960 Summer Olympics, making him the best German combination. He also won a Grand Prix show jumping competition in Berlin.

Personal life
Reiner Klimke was the son of a psychologist and a neurologist. With his wife, Ruth (also a top show jumping and dressage rider), he had three children: Ingrid, Rolf, and Michael. Ingrid competes in eventing and dressage; she won a gold medal at the 2008 Summer Olympics, twenty years after her father's last Olympic gold. Michael also competes at the Grand Prix level in dressage.

Klimke not only rode and trained, but also ran a law firm and served on several boards, including the FEI Dressage Committee. Klimke died from a heart attack at age 63 in Münster, his place of birth. Prior to his death, he had planned to start at the 2000 Summer Olympics.

Publications 

 Cavaletti: Ausbildung von Reiter und Pferd über Bodenricks Stuttgart: Franckh 1966
 Military: Geschichte, Training, Wettkampf Stuttgart: Franckh 1967, "Eventing"
 Cavalletti: Schooling of Horse and Rider over Ground Rails (translation of Cavaletti by Daphne Machin Goodall) London: J.A. Allen 1969
 Le Concours complet: histoire, entraînement, compétition (translation of Military by Pierre André) Paris: Crépin-Leblond 1977
 Grundausbildung des jungen Reitpferdes: von der Fohlenerziehung bis zum ersten Turnierstart Stuttgart: Franckh 1980
 Horse trials (translation of Military by Daphne Machin Goodall) London: J.A. Allen 1984
 Ahlerich von der Remonte zum Dressur-Weltmeister; ein exemplarischer Ausbildungsweg Stuttgart: Franckh 1984
 Basic Training of the Young Horse: From the Education of the Young Foal to the First Competition (translation of Grundausbildung by Sigrid Young) London: J.A. Allen 1985
 Ahlerich: The Making of a Dressage World Champion (translation of Ahlerich by Courtney Searls-Ridge) Gaithersburg, MD: Half Halt Press 1986
 Von der Schönheit der Dressur vom jungen Pferd bis zum Grand Prix Stuttgart: Franckh-Kosmos 1991
 Klimke on Dressage: From the Young Horse Through Grand Prix (translation of the above by Courtney Searls-Ridge and Jan Spauschus Johnson) Middletown, MD: Half Halt Press 1992

See also
 List of multiple Olympic gold medalists
 List of multiple Olympic gold medalists in one event
 List of athletes with the most appearances at Olympic Games
 List of writers on horsemanship

References
 Eurodressage article on Klimke

External links

 
 

1936 births
1999 deaths
German dressage riders
Dressage trainers
German event riders
Olympic equestrians of West Germany
German male equestrians
Olympic equestrians of the United Team of Germany
Equestrians at the 1960 Summer Olympics
Equestrians at the 1964 Summer Olympics
Equestrians at the 1968 Summer Olympics
Equestrians at the 1976 Summer Olympics
Equestrians at the 1984 Summer Olympics
Equestrians at the 1988 Summer Olympics
Olympic gold medalists for West Germany
Olympic gold medalists for the United Team of Germany
Olympic bronze medalists for West Germany
Sportspeople from Münster
Olympic medalists in equestrian
Recipients of the Olympic Order
Articles containing video clips
Writers on horsemanship
Medalists at the 1988 Summer Olympics
Medalists at the 1984 Summer Olympics
Medalists at the 1976 Summer Olympics
Medalists at the 1968 Summer Olympics
Medalists at the 1964 Summer Olympics